Oak Park is a station on the Chicago 'L' system, serving the Blue Line's Forest Park branch and Oak Park, Illinois. The station is alongside the Eisenhower Expressway between Oak Park Avenue and East Avenue, near the Oak Park Conservatory. The auxiliary entrance on East Avenue is half a block from the Oak Park Conservatory.

History

Chicago Terminal Transfer (1893–1902)
The Chicago Terminal Transfer Railroad had a "Kirwin" station at this site as early as 1893.

AE&C (1902–1905)
The interurban Aurora Elgin and Chicago Railway (AE&C) began service on August 5, 1902, and included a station on Oak Park Avenue.

Garfield Park "L" (1905–1958)
The Garfield Park branch, operated by the Metropolitan West Side Elevated Railroad since 1895, abutted the AE&C at 52nd Avenue; on March 11, 1905, the branch assumed local service west to Des Plaines Avenue in exchange for the AE&C going downtown. The AE&C and its successor, the Chicago Aurora and Elgin Railroad (CA&E), continued to maintain westbound-only express service at Oak Park.

Blue Line (1960–present)
The current station opened as part of the Congress Line on March 20, 1960.

Structure
The station consists of a single island platform to the south of the Eisenhower Expressway with an entrance at each end. The main entrance is located at the west end of the platform off of Oak Park Avenue and is connected to the platform by a long ramp. The auxiliary farecard-only entrance is located at the east end of the platform off of East Avenue and is connected to the platform via a staircase and horizontal walkway. The CSX tracks are south of the station.

Bus connections
Pace

 311 Oak Park Avenue

Gallery

Notes and references

Notes

References

External links

Oak Park (Congress Line) Station Page
Oak Park Avenue entrance from Google Maps Street View
East Avenue entrance from Google Maps Street View

CTA Blue Line stations
Railway stations in the United States opened in 1960
Oak Park, Illinois